Mohammed El Arouch (born 6 April 2004) is a French professional footballer who plays as a midfielder for Ligue 1 club Lyon.

Club career
El Arouch was born in Orange in a family of Moroccan descent. El Arouch began his football career at the local club Sporting Club d'Orange in 2009. Considered outclassed by the coaches of his team with a decent quality of passing and dribbling, the young player received the interest of many French clubs (PSG, OM, Monaco, Nice…) and even English (Manchester City...). but his choice fell on Lyon, whom he joined in 2018.

In July 2021, he signed his first professional contract with the club, for three seasons, until 30 June 2024. He is regarded by the media as one of biggest talents ever produced by Olympique Lyon’s Academy. 

During the 2021-22 season, El Arouch played a crucial role on Lyon's Coupe Gambardella's successful campaign, leading the team winning the competition for the first time since 1997. He scored twice in course of the competition, notably the opening goal in the final at the Stade de France, where Lyon defeated Caen 5–4 in a penalty shootout after a 1–1 draw in regular time. 

On 25 February 2023, El Arouch made his professional debut with Lyon, getting subbed on in a Ligue 1 win against Angers, replacing Thiago Mendes in the 89th minute.

International career
El Arouch chose to represent France instead of Morocco at youth level. He capped 7 times France U16, scoring once against Italy U16 during a friendly match. He is currently playing for France U19.

Career statistics

Honours
Lyon Youth
Coupe Gambardella: 2021–22

References

External links

Living people
2004 births
People from Orange, Vaucluse
French footballers
France youth international footballers
French sportspeople of Moroccan descent
Association football midfielders
Olympique Lyonnais players
Ligue 1 players
Championnat National 2 players